Marie Polli (born 28 November 1980) was a female racewalker from Switzerland.

She competed in the Women's 20 kilometres walk event at the 2015 World Championships in Athletics in Beijing, China, finishing the 40th.

See also
 Switzerland at the 2015 World Championships in Athletics

References

External links
http://www.european-athletics.org/athletes/group=p/athlete=132871-polli-marie/index.html
http://www.all-athletics.com/node/147503
http://www.marciadalmondo.com/eng/dettagli_news.aspx?id=2613
http://www.zimbio.com/photos/Marie+Polli/22nd+European+Athletics+Championships+Day/DDY_2L6dAvQ

Female racewalkers
Swiss female racewalkers
Living people
Place of birth missing (living people)
1980 births
Swiss sportswomen
World Athletics Championships athletes for Switzerland
Olympic athletes of Switzerland
Athletes (track and field) at the 2004 Summer Olympics